Flint Bottom Creek is a stream in Ste. Genevieve County in the U.S. state of Missouri. It is a tributary of River aux Vases.

Flint Bottom Creek was so named on account of flint rock at its river bed.

See also
List of rivers of Missouri

References

Rivers of Ste. Genevieve County, Missouri
Rivers of Missouri